The title Marquess de la Pica is a Spanish title bestowed upon Francisco Bravo de Saravia on July 8, 1684 by King Charles II of Spain.

List of holders

 Francisco Bravo de Saravia Ovalle, 1st Marquess of la Pica
 Marcela Bravo de Saravia Iturrizara, 2nd Marchioness of la Pica
 Miguel de Irarrázaval y Bravo de Saravia, 3rd Marquess of la Pica
 José Santiago de Irarrázaval y Portales, 4th Marquess of la Pica
 Fernando Irarrázaval Mackenna, 5th Marquess of la Pica
 Fernando Irarrázaval Fernández, 6th Marquess of la Pica
 Francisco Irarrázaval Fernández, 7th Marquess of la Pica
 Francisco Irarrázaval Mackenna, 8th Marquess of la Pica
 Fernando Mario Eduardo Irarrázaval Eyzaguirre, 9th Marquess of la Pica

External links 
www.paulagutierrez.com: Official website of the present Marchioness consort of la Pica, Paula Carolina Gutiérrez Erlandsen, wife of the 9th Marquis.

Notes 

1684 establishments in Spain
la Pica
Chilean nobility